Daniel Alessander Alessi (born 26 August 1997) is an Australian footballer who currently plays for Hakoah Sydney City East, where he plays as a defender.

Club career

Western Sydney Wanderers
Alessi joined the Western Sydney Wanderers on 13 October 2013 on a Youth League contract for the 2013–14 season. Alessi played his debut game in the senior team in the second Sydney derby of the season on 11 January 2014. He impressed the coach Tony Popovic and was selected for the round's team of the week. In May 2014 Alessi signed a professional contract, keeping him at the club until the end of the 2015–16 season.

Newcastle Jets
Shortly after being released by the Western Sydney Wanderers, Alessi signed with the Newcastle Jets. On 19 February 2018, after not playing for the club, Alessi was released by Newcastle Jets to allow him to take up an opportunity at Manly United.

On 11 January 2020, Alessi joined Southern League Premier Division Central side Stratford Town, on dual registration from Hereford.

In February 2020, Alessi signed a permanent deal with Gosport Borough.

Alessi returned to Australia, signing with National Premier Leagues club Blacktown City in July 2020.

International career
Alessi was called up to the Australia u-20's training squad in December 2013. In September, Alessi travelled to Vietnam for the 2014 AFF U-19 Youth Championship. Alessi was also selected for the 2014 AFC U-19 Championship in October.

Career statistics

Club

Honours

Club
 Western Sydney Wanderers
 AFC Champions League: 2014

References

External links

1997 births
Australian people of Italian descent
Australian expatriate sportspeople in England
Expatriate footballers in England
Association football defenders
Western Sydney Wanderers FC players
Newcastle Jets FC players
Manly United FC players
Hereford F.C. players
Bromsgrove Sporting F.C. players
Stratford Town F.C. players
A-League Men players
Living people
Soccer players from Sydney
People educated at St Joseph's College, Hunters Hill
People educated at Sydney Distance Education High School
Australian soccer players